is a former Japanese football player and coach who is current assistant coach of Yokohama F. Marinos.

Playing career
Oshima was born in Isesaki on March 7, 1980. After graduating from high school, he joined J1 League club Yokohama Flügels in 1998. Although he played several matches as forward, the club was disbanded end of 1998 season due to financial strain. In 1999, he moved to Kyoto Purple Sanga with contemporaries Yasuhito Endo, Kazuki Teshima so on. However he could hardly play in the match. In 2001, he moved to J2 League club Montedio Yamagata. He became a regular player and played many matches until 2004. In 2004, he scored 22 goals and became a top scorer of J2 League in Japanese player. In 2005, he moved to Yokohama F. Marinos. He played many matches and he became a regular forward in 2007. In 2007, he scored 14 goals and became a top scorer of J1 League in Japanese player in 2007. However his opportunity to play decreased in late 2008 and he was released from the club end of 2008 season. In 2009, he moved to Albirex Niigata. Although he could not score many goals, he played as regular player until 2010. However his opportunity to play decreased in 2011. In August 2011, he moved to J2 club JEF United Chiba. In 2012, he moved to Consadole Sapporo. Although he played many matches as substitute, the club was relegated to J2. In 2013, he moved to J2 club Giravanz Kitakyushu. He played many matches as substitute until 2015. In 2016, his opportunity to play decreased and the club finished at bottom place and was relegated J3 League end of 2016 season. He retired end of 2016 season.

Club statistics

J.League Firsts
 Appearance: March 21, 1998. Yokohama Flügels 2 vs 1 Yokohama Marinos, International Stadium Yokohama
 Goal: March 10, 2001. Kyoto Purple Sanga 2 vs 2 Montedio Yamagata, Nishikyogoku Athletic Stadium

References

External links

1980 births
Living people
Association football people from Gunma Prefecture
Japanese footballers
J1 League players
J2 League players
Yokohama Flügels players
Kyoto Sanga FC players
Montedio Yamagata players
Yokohama F. Marinos players
Albirex Niigata players
JEF United Chiba players
Hokkaido Consadole Sapporo players
Giravanz Kitakyushu players
Association football forwards